Snipping Tool is a Microsoft Windows screenshot utility included in Windows Vista and later. It can take still screenshots of an open window, rectangular areas, a free-form area, or the entire screen. Snips can then be annotated using a mouse or a tablet, stored as an image file (PNG, GIF, or JPEG file) or an MHTML file, or e-mailed. Snipping Tool allows for basic image editing of the snapshot, with different colored pens, an eraser, and a highlighter.

History
Before Windows Vista, Snipping Tool, originally known as the Clipping Tool, was included in the Experience Pack for Windows XP Tablet PC Edition 2005. It was originally released as a PowerToy for the Microsoft Tablet PC launch on November 7, 2002.

In Windows 10 version 1809, a new Universal app version of Snipping Tool known as Snip & Sketch was introduced. It was first named Screen Sketch, and was initially a component of the Windows Ink Workspace. Snipping Tool was modified to contain a notice warning of the application's deprecation, which encouraged users to move to Snip & Sketch. Despite this, the app was never removed from Windows 10.

In April 2021, Microsoft released Windows 10 Insider build 21354, which made Snipping Tool updateable from the Microsoft Store by being packaged with Snip & Sketch.

In Windows 11 insider build 22000.132, released on August 12, 2021, both Snip & Sketch and the legacy version of Snipping Tool were merged into an updated version of Snipping Tool, which has an interface similar to the legacy Snipping Tool.

See also
 Features new to Windows Vista

References

External links
 Support document
 Tutorial To Use Snipping Tool

Windows components
Windows Vista
Windows 7
Windows 8
Windows Server 2008
Windows Server 2008 R2
Screenshot software